Daniela Gass (born 5 November 1980) is a German racing cyclist.

Major results

2011
 4th Road race, National Road Championships
2013
 4th Omloop van het Hageland
 7th Classica Citta di Padova
 7th Erondegemse Pijl
 8th Sparkassen Giro Bochum
2014
 5th Trofee Maarten Wynants
2015
 6th Frauen Grand Prix Gippingen
2016
 9th Trofee Maarten Wynants
 10th Diamond Tour
2018
 2nd Overall Panorama Guizhou International Women's Road Cycling Race
 5th GP Sofie Goos
 7th Omloop van de Westhoek - Memorial Stive Vermaut
 8th Flanders Ladies Classic
 9th Erondegemse Pijl
2019
 2nd Le Samyn des Dames
 5th MerXem Classic
 6th Erondegemse Pijl
 7th Trofee Maarten Wynants
 7th Diamond Tour

See also
 Squadra Scappatella

References

External links
 

1980 births
Living people
German female cyclists
Cyclists from Rhineland-Palatinate
People from Bad Dürkheim (district)
20th-century German women
21st-century German women